Cecilio Guzmán de Rojas  (24 October 1899 – 14 February 1950)  was a Bolivian painter who was a leader of the indigenous art movement during the first half of the 20th century.

Life
He was born in Potosí and died, committing suicide, in La Paz. He was a student of Avelino Nogales and Julio Romero de Torres.

He was the father of the noted scientist and linguist Iván Guzmán de Rojas.

References

1899 births
1950 suicides
Bolivian painters
Suicides in Bolivia
20th-century Bolivian male artists
20th-century Bolivian painters
1950 deaths